Sylvan-Highlands  is a neighborhood of Portland, Oregon, United States located on the west side of the West Hills.

History
In 1850, Nathan B. Jones, a pioneer of 1847, settled at the head of Tanner Creek and platted lots for a community he called "Zion Town". It is unknown if he named the place for Mount Zion, a summit located about a mile to the southeast. Because the name "Zion" for a local post office would have caused confusion, as there had already been two post offices so-named in Oregon, a resident suggested the name "Sylvan", from the Roman deity of the woods Silvanus. The office was established in 1890 and it closed in 1906. Nathan B. Jones, who was considered an eccentric hermit, had wanted Zion Town to become the new capitol of Oregon. He was murdered during the course of a robbery in 1894. Sylvan post office was located at what today is the interchange of Sunset Highway, Scholls Ferry Road and Skyline Boulevard within the Portland city limits in Multnomah County.

Schools
Schools that serve the neighborhood include Ainsworth Elementary School, Bridlemile Elementary School, West Sylvan Middle School, and Lincoln High School.

Parks and visitor attractions
The Portland Children's Museum, the Oregon Zoo and Washington Park are all located in the neighborhood.

Neighborhood organizations
The Sylvan-Highlands Neighborhood Association meets on the second Tuesday of every months. The association is a member of Neighbors West-Northwest.

References

External links 
Sylvan-Highlands Neighborhood Association

 

Neighborhoods in Portland, Oregon